Anaran may refer to:
 Anaran, Nehbandan, South Khorasan Province
 Anaran Rural District, in Ilam Province